Surra, Azerbaijan may refer to:
Surra, Davachi, Azerbaijan
Surra, Sabirabad, Azerbaijan
Aşağı Surra, Azerbaijan